60th Brigade may refer to:

 87th Mixed Brigade (Spain)
 87th Brigade (United Kingdom)
 87th Infantry Brigade (United States)

See also

 87th Division (disambiguation)
 87th Regiment (disambiguation)